Ashley Robinson (born August 12, 1982), nicknamed A-Rob or Robbo, is a 6'4" professional basketball player in the WNBA, most recently played for the Seattle Storm.

High school
Robinson played for South Grand Prairie High School in Grand Prairie, Texas, where she was named a WBCA All-American. She participated in the 2000 WBCA High School All-America Game where she scored eleven points, and earned MVP honors.

College
Robinson attended college at the University of Tennessee and graduated in 2004.

Tennessee statistics
Source

USA Basketball
Robinson was a member of the USA Women's U18 team which won the gold medal at the FIBA Americas Championship in Mar Del Plata, Argentina. The event was held in July 2000, when the USA team defeated Cuba to win the championship. Robinson was the leading scorer with 15 points in the opening game against Mexico. She averaged 8.4 points per game and was the third highest rebounder on the team with 5.2 per game.

Professional
Robinson, a center, ranked thirteenth in the WNBA in blocks per game as of August 2008. She formerly played for the Chicago Sky and Phoenix Mercury.

Robinson will now travel to Australia to play with the Dandenong Rangers in the WNBL with her Seattle teammate, Abby Bishop, an Australian native.

Robinson helped the Seattle Storm win their second championship in 2010.

Robinson signed with the Storm on July 12, 2013, to make a return to Seattle.

References

1982 births
Living people
American women's basketball players
Basketball players from Texas
Centers (basketball)
Chicago Sky players
Phoenix Mercury draft picks
Phoenix Mercury players
Seattle Storm players
Tennessee Lady Volunteers basketball players